Tyrella is a civil parish in County Down, Northern Ireland. It is situated in the historic barony of Lecale Upper.

Townlands
Tyrella civil parish contains the following townlands:

Carrickinab
Clanmaghery
Commons of Clanmaghery
Glovet
Tyrella North
Tyrella South

See also
List of civil parishes of County Down

References